Eduardo García is the name of:

Sports
Eduardo Garcia (boxer) (born 1942), Mexican boxer and trainer
Eduardo García (footballer) (1945–2016), who represented both Uruguay and Ecuador
Edu García (Eduardo García Martín, born 1990), Spanish footballer 
Luis Eduardo García (born 1994), Mexican footballer

Other people
Eduardo Garcia (American chef) (born 1981), American chef of Mexican cuisine
Eduardo García (Mexican chef) (21st century), chef of Maximo Bistrot in Mexico City
Eduardo Horacio García (born 1956), Roman Catholic auxiliary bishop of Buenos Aires
Eduardo García de Enterría (1923–2013), Spanish jurist
Eduardo García Máynez (1908–1993), Mexican jurist
Eduardo Garcia (politician) (born 1977), member of the California State Assembly
Eddie Garcia (1929–2019), Filipino film actor and director

See also
Ed Garcia (disambiguation)